Banana District was a district of the Congo Free State and Belgian Congo. 
It disappeared in a reorganization of 1910.

Location

Banana used to be a fishing village in a sheltered cove.
A map of the Congo Free State in 1897 shows the town of Banana on the north side of the bay where the Congo River enters the Atlantic Ocean. 
The Banana District extended a short distance along the north bank of the river to the Boma District.
To the north it bordered the Portuguese territory of Cabinda, and the Portuguese territory to the south of the Congo faced it across the river.

History

The people of Banana were in contact with Europeans for four centuries before the Belgians established their colony.
From November 1874 to 12 August 1877 Henry Morton Stanley made his first trans-Africa exploration, crossing the African continent from Zanzibar to Banana.
During the expedition he explored Lake Victoria and Lake Tanganyika, and recorded the course of the Congo River from the Luama River to the cataracts downstream from Stanley Pool.
When the first members of the International Association of the Congo (Association Internationale du Congo: AIC) came to Banana in 1878 they found the main posts of four factories, two French, one British and one Dutch.

The Congo Free State was created at the start of 1885 with Leopold II of Belgium as its absolute ruler.
On 17 September 1885 the Congo Free State joined the Universal Postal Union.
The next day it was decreed that post offices would be established at Banana, Boma and Vivi.
The extent of Banana District was defined on 7 January 1886 as being from the ocean up the north coast of the river to and including Ponta da Lenha.
On 19 January 1886 Leopold issued a decree to protect the shore at Banana from erosion, forbidding any work that would tend to damage the banks such as removing sand, earth or stones, or digging holes.
On 23 April 1886 he decreed that the seat of the court of first instance of Bas-Congo would be at Banana.

At first maritime navigation was concentrated in Banana since Boma was thought to be inaccessible to heavy vessels.
Banana was the main port from which goods produced in the colony were exported to Europe, and where export duties were collected.
Of the exported products, the most valuable were ivory, palm kernels, palm oil and rubber.
During the months of January, February and March 1890, 25  ocean-going vessels arrived at Banana and 30 departed, compared to 8 arrivals and 10 departures for Boma.
Later, the government marked the channels with buoys up to Boma and Matadi, and built lighthouses.

The Congo Free State founded a naval training school at Banana, and the Boma Red Cross built a sanitarium where sick colonists could recover their health beside the sea.
By 1898, the district of Banana had a total of 95 Europeans in 25 houses.
The Congo Free State was annexed by Belgium in 1908 as the Belgian Congo.
In 1910 the western districts of Banana, Boma, Matadi and Cataracts were consolidated into one administrative unit, Bas-Congo (Lower Congo).

Gallery

See also
Districts of the Congo Free State
Districts of the Belgian Congo

References

Sources

 / http://www.kaowarsom.be/en/online_maps

Districts of the Congo Free State
Districts of the Belgian Congo